James John Thomas (1868 – August 6, 1947) was a Republican politician from the U.S. state of Ohio. He was the 40th mayor of Columbus, Ohio and the 36th person to serve in that office.   He was elected on Tuesday, November 4, 1919 and defeated incumbent Democratic mayor George J. Karb.  He served Columbus immediately after World War I and throughout the 1920s.

After three consecutive terms in office he was defeated in the 1931 mayoral election by Henry W. Worley.

References

Bibliography

External links
James J. Thomas at Political Graveyard

Mayors of Columbus, Ohio
1868 births
1947 deaths
People from Wrexham
Welsh emigrants to the United States
Ohio Republicans
Columbus City Council members